Magdolna Nyári-Kovács (1 July 1921 – 5 May 2005) was a Hungarian fencer. She won a silver medal in the women's team foil event at the 1960 Summer Olympics.

References

External links
 

1921 births
2005 deaths
Hungarian female foil fencers
Olympic fencers of Hungary
Fencers at the 1952 Summer Olympics
Fencers at the 1956 Summer Olympics
Fencers at the 1960 Summer Olympics
Olympic silver medalists for Hungary
Olympic medalists in fencing
Fencers from Budapest
Medalists at the 1960 Summer Olympics
20th-century Hungarian women